Hypsipyla elachistalis is a species of snout moth in the genus Hypsipyla. It was described by George Hampson in 1903 and is known from Sri Lanka.

References

Moths described in 1903
Phycitini